Denis Dalton (born 10 October 1942) is a former Australian rules footballer who played for Collingwood in the Victorian Football League (VFL) during the 1960s and a former international lawn bowler.

Australian rules
An Old Paradian, Dalton was used mostly as a rover in his two seasons at Collingwood. He appeared in the 1964 VFL Grand Final and kicked a goal from the forward pocket, in a four-point loss. Dalton later played for Preston in the Victorian Football Association, and finished equal-third for the J. J. Liston Trophy in 1967.

Lawn bowls
He won a bronze medal at the 1982 Commonwealth Games in Brisbane for the Men's Pairs, with Peter Rheuben. It was the same Commonwealth Games where another former VFL player, Bob Edmond, won a silver medal for weightlifting.

Eight years later he lost the bronze medal play off in the fours with Ken Woods, Dennis Katunarich and Rex Johnston at the 1990 Commonwealth Games in Auckland.

References

Holmesby, Russell and Main, Jim (2007). The Encyclopedia of AFL Footballers. 7th ed. Melbourne: Bas Publishing.

1942 births
Living people
Collingwood Football Club players
Preston Football Club (VFA) players
Old Paradians Amateur Football Club players
Commonwealth Games bronze medallists for Australia
Australian male bowls players
Bowls players at the 1982 Commonwealth Games
Australian rules footballers from Victoria (Australia)
Commonwealth Games medallists in lawn bowls
Medallists at the 1982 Commonwealth Games